{{Drugbox
| IUPAC_name = N,N-Dibutyl-''N-(3-phenyl-1,2,4-oxadiazol-5-yl)ethane-1,2-diamine
| image = butalamine.png

| tradename =  
| pregnancy_AU = 
| pregnancy_US = 
| pregnancy_category =  
| legal_AU = 
| legal_CA = 
| legal_UK = 
| legal_US = 
| legal_status =  
| routes_of_administration =  

| bioavailability =  
| protein_bound =  
| metabolism =  
| elimination_half-life =  
| excretion =  

| CAS_number = 22131-35-7
| ATC_prefix = C04
| ATC_suffix = AX23
| PubChem = 30949
| DrugBank =  
| ChEMBL = 1697825
| ChemSpiderID = 28712
| UNII_Ref = 
| UNII = 140T9JTG43

| C=18 | H=28 | N=4 | O=1 
| smiles = n1c(onc1c2ccccc2)NCCN(CCCC)CCCC
}}Butalamine is a vasodilator.

Synthesis
Check with imolamine (alternate nitrogen reacts)

 The halogenation of benzamidoxime [932-90-1] [622-31-1] (1) with chlorine and subsequent reaction with cyanamide (3) gives 5-amino-3-phenyl-1,2,4-oxadiazole [3663-37-4] (4). Base catalyzed alkylation with dibutylaminoethyl chloride [13422-90-7] (5) completes the synthesis of butalamine (6''').

References 

Vasodilators
Oxadiazoles